Jones Lang LaSalle Incorporated (JLL) is a global commercial real estate services company, founded in the United Kingdom with offices in 80 countries. The company also provides investment management services worldwide, including services to institutional and retail investors, and to high-net-worth individuals, as well as technology products through JLL Technologies, and VC investments via its PropTech fund, JLL Spark. The company is ranked 185 on the Fortune 500. It is one of the "Big Three" commercial real estate services companies, alongside Cushman & Wakefield and CBRE.

Operations
JLL is headquartered in Chicago, Illinois, and as of October 2018 was the second-largest public brokerage firm in the world. The company has more than 98,000 employees in 80 countries, as of 2022.

Services include investment management, asset management, sales and leasing, property management, project management, and development. In 2014, the organization shortened its name to JLL for marketing purposes, while the legal name remained Jones Lang LaSalle Incorporated.

Former company president Christian Ulbrich succeeded Colin Dyer as CEO in October 2016. Karen Brennan was named CFO on June 22, 2020 effective July 15, 2020. Sheila Penrose served as board chairwoman starting in 2005, and was replaced by Siddharth ("Bobby") Mehta in 2020.

History
After LaSalle Partners' IPO in 1997, in 1999, it merged with Jones Lang Wootton to form Jones Lang LaSalle (JLL) as part of a $435 million deal. 
Jones Lang Wootton was a London auctioneer that originated in the 1700s. By 1976, Jones Lang Wootton expanded into the United States real estate market in New York City. The company had 4,000 employees in 33 countries around the time of the merger with LaSalle Partners.

William Sanders founded real estate company International Development Corp in 1966 in El Paso, Texas.
Sanders renamed the company LaSalle Partners in 1968 and relocated to Chicago, Illinois. The company first offered investment banking, investment management, and land services. By 1997, LaSalle had grown into three business divisions, Management Services, Corporate and Financial Services, and Investment Management, with ten U.S. corporate offices and seven international offices. LaSalle Partners made an initial public offering in 1996.

JLL purchased The Staubach Company in 2008. Roger Staubach served as executive chairman of JLL from 2008 until he retired in 2018. JLL merged with UK-based King Sturge in a £197 million deal in 2011. The combined business, with 2,700 employees and 43 offices, created the largest property agent in the UK, as reported by The Telegraph in 2011. The company acquired Irish-based Guardian Property Asset Management in 2015. LaSalle Investment Management, a subsidiary of JLL, managed $58 billion in real estate investments for institutional and retail clients, as of 2016. JLL had acquired 80 companies and established 100 offices worldwide by 2016.

The company expanded from commercial real estate services to include property technology or "proptech", with the 2017 launch of its JLL Spark division. In June 2018, JLL Spark created a $100 million venture fund to invest in real estate start-ups, such as a technology to link office users with co-working spaces.

JLL announced the acquisition of HFF in a deal worth $2 billion in March 2019. The acquisition was completed in July 2019 and worth $1.8 billion.

In 2021, the company's technology division sold Stessa, the single-family rental asset management software company it acquired in 2018, to Roofstock as part of a deal in which JLL acquired a minority stake in Roofstock and it would provide services to JLL's clients.

JLL manages the London offices of the social media company Facebook. In July 2021, JLL sought the removal of a cleaner from the offices when, in his capacity as a trade union representative, he organised a protest against a doubling of the cleaners’ workloads. 

In August 2021, JLL announced the acquisition of Skyline Al.

In late 2021 and early 2022, JLL made two "proptech" acquisitions. In November 2021, it purchased the property management software company Building Engines, and in February 2022 it acquired Hank, a company developing AI-based technology to improve energy efficiency of buildings.

References

 
Companies listed on the New York Stock Exchange
Companies based in Chicago
Real estate services companies of the United States
Shopping center management firms
Real estate companies established in 1999
Property services companies of the United Kingdom
Commercial real estate companies
1999 establishments in Illinois